Orion's Sword is a compact asterism in the constellation Orion. It comprises three stars (42 Orionis, Theta Orionis, and Iota Orionis) and M42, the Orion Nebula, which together are thought to resemble a sword or its scabbard. This group is south of the prominent asterism, Orion's Belt.  Fables and old beliefs are in Europe dominated or widely influenced by those of the Greco-Roman narratives.  Beyond Europe this grouping is quite widely referenced as a weapon just as the majority of cultures perceived Orion's standout asymmetrical "hourglass" of seven very bright stars as a human.

Components

Orion Nebula 

The Orion Nebula consists of one of the nearest (thus in the Milky Way Galaxy), massive molecular clouds (30 - 40 light years in diameter) about 1,300 light years from the solar system. This makes the nebula potentially the closest HII region to Earth, a mass of hydrogen that has been ionized by nearby, hot, young stars. Regions like this are called stellar nurseries, nurturing the birth of multiple young stars such as the Orion Nebula Star Cluster. These are a hallmark of the asterism.

Main stars 

42 Orionis, also called c Ori, is a B1V magnitude star in the northern half of the Orion nebula. Theta Orionis has a more central position in the nebula, and is actually composed of a multi-star system. Iota Orionis is one of the brightest in the collection, in the south of the Orion nebula. Iota Orionis is a spectroscopic binary system, with a variable magnitude of O9III.

Scientific studies 
Given the scientific significance of M42, Orion's Sword is a popular spot for stellar and protostellar studies. Using the Hubble Space Telescope, O'dell et al. focused on identifying previously unseen features of the nebula, such as high-ionization shocks, compact sources, and protoplanetary disks. Some studies have focused on the sword region overall. Gomez & Leda found that less than half of the OB and Hα stars in this region are associated with well-defined stellar clusters. This positional similarity, as well as the high star formation rates and gas pressure in the nearby molecular cloud, confirms the previous notion that old, foreground OB stars triggered star formation in this cloud.

References in history and culture 
In his De Astronomia, Hyginus describes the constellation Orion having three faint stars where the sword is depicted. Aratus goes into significant detail about the Orion constellation as well, proclaiming: "Should anyone fail to catch sight of him (Orion) up in the heavens on a clear night, he should not expect to behold anything more splendid when he gazes up at the sky." Arabic astronomers also saw this asterism as a sword, calling it , Sword of the Powerful One or Sword of the Giant. Orion is one of the few constellations to have parallel identities in European and Chinese culture, given the name Shen, the hunter and warrior. Chinese astronomers made the sword a sub-constellation within Shen called Fa.

In the myths of the Nama of Namibia and the western Cape, this was the arrow of the husband of the Pleiades, daughters of the sky god, who was represented by Orion's SW main star Rigel. When he fired his arrow at three zebras (Orion's belt) and missed, he was too afraid to retrieve the arrow due to its proximity to a fierce lion, represented by Betelgeuse. Therefore, he sits in the cold, suffering from hunger but too ashamed to return home.  Regionally the prevailing cold breezes and currents come from that direction. The Tswana to the east traditionally call the unusually bright nebula and its companions , three dogs which chase the three pigs (the belt). This serves as an etiological myth for why pigs have their litters in the same season Orion is prominent in the sky.

Orion's sword is referenced in the song "The Dark of the Sun" by Tom Petty on his 1991 album Into the Great Wide Open, in the line "saw you sail across a river underneath Orion's sword...". It is also mentioned in Jethro Tull's song "Orion", on their 1979 album Stormwatch, in the lines "Your faithful dog shines brighter than its lord and master, your jewelled sword twinkles as the world rolls by."

Gallery

See also
Orion (constellation)
Orion's Belt
Thornborough Henges
Orion Correlation Theory

Notes

Orion (constellation)
Asterisms (astronomy)